Alpha Omicron Sigma is a Puerto Rican fraternity established in 1957.

History
The Honorable Alpha Omicron Sigma Fraternity was established during the months of August and September of the year 1956, and was initially called Alpha Phriggia Sigma, through the efforts of a group of young students from the Pontifical Catholic University of Puerto Rico in Ponce, the which were aware of a fraternity where the principles of Equality, Justice and Fraternity were practiced to capacity. It was on April 1, 1957, when it was officially incorporated as a non-profit corporation by being registered in the Registry of Corporations and Entities of Puerto Rico.

Charities
The fraternity has actively participated in different charitable activities such as "Rapados por una Causa II', which translates to "Shaved for a cause II", for the Cabezitas Rapadas foundation which assists economically and emotionally cancer patients in radio and chemotherapy. 

The fraternity has also participated in the collection of shoes of both genders for people with needs to later be delivered to the charity organization "Soles4Souls" Capítulo de Puerto Rico.

After the 2010 Haiti earthquake, the fraternity was also collecting essential items to be donated to those affected by the earthquake.

Chapters
 Alpha – Ponce
 Beta – Río Piedras 
 Gamma – Mayagüez 
 Delta – Arecibo
 Epsilon – San Germán
 Zeta – Aguadilla
 Eta – Humacao
 Kappa – Cayey
 Omega – Utuado

Passive Zones
 Zona Pasiva Norte - Arecibo
 Zona Pasiva Sur - Ponce
 Zona Pasiva Otoao - Utuado
 Zona Pasiva Metro
 Zona Edgardo José Cartagena

See also 
Puerto Rican fraternities and sororities

Footnotes

Fraternities and sororities in Puerto Rico
1957 establishments in Puerto Rico
Student organizations established in 1957
Latino fraternities and sororities